Stephen Donnelly (born 14 December 1975) is an Irish Fianna Fáil politician who has served as Minister for Health since June 2020. He has been a Teachta Dála (TD) for the Wicklow constituency since 2011.

On his election to Dáil Éireann, Donnelly first sat as an Independent deputy. He then co-founded the Social Democrats in 2015, becoming joint leader of the new party. He left the Social Democrats in 2016, and represented Wicklow as an independent before joining Fianna Fáil in February 2017.

Education and career
Donnelly is a graduate of University College Dublin (UCD) with a degree in mechanical engineering. He also worked and studied in the Massachusetts Institute of Technology (MIT). In 2000, Donnelly moved to London, where he worked as a management consultant with McKinsey & Company.

In 2008, he completed a master's degree in Public Administration in International Development at the Harvard Kennedy School of Government. He returned to work for McKinsey and Company, in Dublin, before deciding to run for office in 2011.

Political career
In October 2012, he addressed Martin Schulz, President of the European Parliament, in Dáil Éireann, on behalf of the technical group, saying: "€67 billion is being borrowed from the troika, virtually all of which is going into the banks and almost the same amount is being given by the banks to the senior bondholders in terms of forgone losses. This is what has happened: there has been a €67 billion circle of money from the troika through Ireland to the international banks and investors… I thank Mr. Schulz for his support and I hope he will be able to bring this simple message back: Ireland did not get a bailout and Ireland is not looking for aid or benevolence. We need our money back in order that we can contribute to the recovery of Europe."

Miriam Lord of The Irish Times made Donnelly her 2012 Politician of the Year, owing to his contributions on the post-2008 Irish banking crisis.

Independent and Social Democrats
Donnelly entered political life being elected as an Independent TD at the 2011 general election. On 15 July 2015, Donnelly launched the Social Democrats, becoming co-leader along with former Labour Party TD Róisín Shortall and former Independent TD Catherine Murphy. Donnelly left the party on 5 September 2016, stating "some partnerships simply don't work". After leaving the Social Democrats, Donnelly spent the next five months as an Independent TD again for Wicklow.

Fianna Fáil
In February 2017, Donnelly announced that he was joining Fianna Fáil. Upon joining, Donnelly said that he believed Fianna Fáil to be "the best team that most closely align with my politics who I believe are taking these challenges very seriously". During a 2017 radio interview, Donnelly was questioned about a previous newspaper column, in which, after paraphrasing an unnamed person about Fianna Fáil's perceived problems and "lack of accountability", Donnelly wrote that he "hate[d] it when the cynics are right". Donnelly initially said that he did not know where the host was quoting from - later stating: "I stand corrected". He was appointed party spokesperson for Brexit. In a Front-Bench reshuffle in March 2018, he was appointed Fianna Fáil spokesperson on health. Donnelly was elected on the 15th count in the Wicklow constituency  to the 33rd Dáil in the 2020 general election, although he won fewer votes than when he stood with the Social Democrats three years prior.

Drug laws
In a 2017 interview with Hot Press magazine, Donnelly spoke about smoking cannabis and use of other drugs. When asked whether he had taken drugs other than cannabis, Donnelly responded: "I have but that's all the detail I'm going to go into".

After being announced as a minister in the 2020 cabinet, Donnelly reportedly stood by his 2017 comments, and noted an openness to the liberalisation of some drug laws, stating that if "you're doing something that's not harming anybody else, it's hard to see a legitimate role for the State in prosecuting you for it". A 2020 news article described Donnelly as "broadly supportive" of supervised injection centres and open to making cannabis legal.

Minister for Health
As part of the coalition government of the 33rd Dáil, Donnelly was appointed Minister for Health by Taoiseach Micheál Martin on 27 June 2020, during the COVID-19 pandemic in Ireland. His tenure to date has resulted in several gaffes, most notably when he compared the danger to children from returning to schools during the pandemic to that of jumping on trampolines. He has been criticised for not being on top of his brief, for floating ideas in the media such as a mooted third change in several weeks to Ireland's vaccine rollout plan, and during the height of lockdown, querying why his department's officials weren't retweeting his tweets.

On 31 August 2022, Donnelly admitted that he failed to register a rental property in Dublin for three years with the Residential Tenancies Board (RTB), and only did so after it emerged Fianna Fáil TD Robert Troy had also registered a property late. In a statement, his spokesperson said this was due to "an oversight" and had been corrected online "last week". Donnelly had declared a south Dublin rental property on the Dáil register of members' interests.

On 17 December 2022, he was re-appointed to the same position following Leo Varadkar's appointment as Taoiseach.

Personal life
Donnelly lives in Greystones, County Wicklow, with his wife and three sons. He has a black belt in Taekwondo.

References

External links
Stephen Donnelly's page on the Fianna Fáil website

 

1975 births
Living people
Alumni of University College Dublin
Independent TDs
Irish male taekwondo practitioners
Harvard Kennedy School alumni
Massachusetts Institute of Technology alumni
McKinsey & Company people
Members of the 31st Dáil
Members of the 32nd Dáil
Members of the 33rd Dáil
Politicians from County Wicklow
TDs
TDs
People from Greystones
Ministers for Health (Ireland)